A temple is a building used for religious practices and activities.

In the Abrahamic religions, The Temple usually refers to the Temple in Jerusalem, the destroyed holy site of biblical Israel.

Temple may also refer to:

Other common meanings
 Temple (anatomy), a part of the head
 Temple (name), a list of people and fictional characters with the surname or given name

Arts and entertainment

Film and television
 Temple (film), a 2017 horror film
 Temple (TV series), a Sky One television series

Literature 
 Temple (novel), a 1999 novel by Matthew Reilly
 The Temple (novel), by Stephen Spender, written in 1928 and published in 1988
 "The Temple" (Lovecraft short story), by H.P. Lovecraft (1920)
 "The Temple" (Oates short story), by Joyce Carol Oates (1996)
 The Temple, the principle collection of poetry by George Herbert, published 1633

Music
 Temple Records (disambiguation), several record labels
 Temples (band), an English psychedelic rock band from Kettering
 Temple (album), a 2020 album by Thao & the Get Down Stay Down
 "Temple" (Kings of Leon song)
 "Temple", a song by Tonight Alive from their album Underworld
 "The Temple", a song from the 1971 rock opera Jesus Christ Superstar by Andrew Lloyd Webber and Tim Rice
 Temple, a soloist project of guitarist Walter Giardino

Painting
 The Temple (painting), a 1949 painting by Paul Delvaux

Places

Canada
 Temple, Calgary, a neighbourhood in Calgary, Alberta
 Mount Temple (Alberta), a mountain

France
 Temple (Paris Métro), a station of the Paris métro
 Square du Temple, a garden and former location of a fortress in Paris

United Kingdom
 Temple, Cornwall, a village
 Temple, Glasgow, Scotland, a neighbourhood
 The Temple, Liverpool, an office building
 Temple, London, an area in the vicinity of Temple Church
 Temple tube station
 Temple, Midlothian, a village

United States
 Temple, Georgia
 Temple, Indiana
 Temple, Maine
 Temple, Michigan
 Temple, New Hampshire
 Temple, North Dakota
 Temple, Oklahoma
 Temple, Pennsylvania
 Temple, Texas
 The Temple (Atlanta)
 The Temple (Old Orchard Beach, Maine)
 The Temple (Cleveland, Ohio)
 Temple Mountain (Idaho)
 Temple Mountain (New Hampshire)
 The Temple (Washington), a mountain in Washington state

Schools in the United States 
 Temple University, Pennsylvania
 Temple College, Texas
 Temple High School (disambiguation)

Other uses
 Temple (weaving), a part of a weaving machine for spreading the cloth
 Side-pieces on a set of glasses
 Temple, a variety of tangor, a cross between an orange and a tangerine
 Temple Owls, the athletic program of Temple University
 Temple shipbuilders, Tyneside, late 18th and early 19th century
 Temple Hotels, a Canadian company that owns and manages Canadian hotels
 Rangers Ballpark in Arlington, Texas, nicknamed "The Temple"
 TempleOS, a computer operating system

See also
 
 
 Temple Mount, Jerusalem, a hill
 Temple City, California
 Tempel (disambiguation)
 Stephan Templ, Austrian author and journalist
 Timple, a Canary Islands stringed instrument